Beauty World is a Singaporean musical written by Michael Chiang and composed by Dick Lee. Drawing on the tradition of 1950s black-and-white Cantonese movies, it tells the story of a young Malaysian girl who comes from Batu Pahat to 1960s Singapore in search of her father and winds up in the eponymous sleazy night club. It premiered at the 1988 Singapore Arts Festival. 

Written in English with some Singlish elements and Singaporean slang, it is one of the best known musicals of Singapore. With Makan Place, which was also written in 1988, it is one of the first two Singaporean musicals.

Plot 
Ivy Chan travels from Malaysia to Singapore in hopes of finding her father. Her only clue is a jade pendant inscribed with the words "Beauty World". Once in Singapore, Ivy meets her penpal friend, Rosemary Joseph. Beauty World turns out to be a cabaret, commanded by head girl LuLu. Ivy goes undercover at Beauty World, where she grows closer to the cabaret members, especially the club's bouncer, Ah Hock. This complicates things when Ivy's boyfriend, Frankie, comes to Singapore to bring her home.

Productions 
The original 1988 production began rehearsals in January of that year. It was directed by Kengsen Ong and choreographed by Najip Ali. On opening night, technical issues halted the show for about half an hour. Actresses Claire Wong and Jacintha Abisheganaden adlibbed a conversation for about five minutes, hoping to fill the silence. Although critical response to the show was negative, it was very popular with audiences.

Beauty World toured four cities in Japan (Osaka, Tokyo, Hiroshima and Fukuoka) and had a run in Singapore in 1992. In 1998, Beauty World was remade for television for the President's Star Charity Show, and starred Sharon Au as Lulu, and Evelyn Tan as Ivy. The musical was staged again at the Victoria Theater in April of that same year.

An amateur production took place on 15 April 2006 at the University of Chicago. Dubbed Return to Beauty World it was directed by Andy Tan a fourth year economics major in the college.

The King's College London Malaysian Singaporean Society put up a student production of Beauty World at The Albany in Deptford South-East London on 2 and 3 March 2009. It was produced by Debra Lam and directed by Kang Yanyi.

In 2008, W!LD RICE, celebrated the 20th anniversary of the musical by staging the musical for the forth time at the Esplanade Theatre. The musical starred Irene Ang, Neo Swee Lin, Elena Wang and also featured
Daren Tan, Project Superstar II winner. The production also added six new songs, written by Dick Lee.

In 2014, a student production of Beauty World was put up by National University of Singapore (NUS) College of Alice and Peter Tan (CAPT) on 8 February, which opened to a 900-strong audience at the University Culture Centre at NUS and was attended by its scriptwriter and playwright, Chiang. The musical was produced by Ong Wee Yong and Sherilyn Tan, directed by Heidi Chan and took its musical direction from Elaine Hoong.

In 2015, the musical was staged for the seventh time at the Victoria Theatre, with composer Lee as the director instead. The production was set to be in a darker mood and starred Jeanette Aw, Cheryl Tan and Janice Koh.

Musical numbers

Act l 

 "Beauty World Cha-Cha-Cha" (Chorus)
 "Nothing Gets in My Way" (Lulu)
 "Single in Singapore" (Rosemary)
 "There'll Be a New You" (Lily, Rosie, and Daisy)
 "Another World" (Ah Hock)
 "I Didn't Care" (Ivy Chan)
 "Truth Will Conquer All" (Chorus)

Act ll 

 "Welcome to Beauty World" (Madame, Lulu, Wan Choo, and Chorus)
 "It Wasn't Meant For Me" (Rosemary and Ah Hock)
 "No Class" (Lulu and Rosemary)
 "Not A Hero" (Frankie and Chorus)
 "Beauty World Reprise" (Company)

Cast

References 

1988 musicals
Singaporean musicals